Operation Tan No. 2 (Dainiji Tan Sakusen) was a long-range kamikaze mission directed at the main Allied naval fleet anchorage at Ulithi Atoll in the western Pacific on March 11, 1945 during the Pacific campaign of World War II.  The Japanese hoped to take the U.S. Pacific fleet by surprise and sink or damage a significant number of the fleet's aircraft carriers or other large ships.

The attack 
The Azusa Special Attack Unit, to which were allocated twenty-four "Yokosuka P1Y1" twin-engine bombers took off from the Kanoya Air Field on Kyushu, the southernmost of the main Japanese islands. The aircraft were bound for the US naval base at Ulithi on a one way trip at the limits of their range in an attempt to destroy the Fifth Fleet carriers at anchor there. Each of the planes carried an 800 kg (1,700-pound) bomb, which they intended to deliver by crashing onto the American flight decks.  A number of support aircraft and submarines were used to help guide the attackers over their long flight.

Some six of the P1Y1s suffered mechanical difficulties and had to turn back to their home base at Kanoya. Others landed at Yap island. Still others had to ditch at sea. Two of the twenty-four aircraft reached Ulithi, arriving after nightfall and achieving complete surprise. One aircraft hit the Essex class aircraft carrier USS Randolph in the stern  just below the flight deck, killing 26 men and wounding 105, many of whom were watching a movie in the ship's hangar deck.  The second aircraft crashed onto an access road on the small island of Sorlen, apparently mistaking the road with its nearby signal tower for a ship.  There were no deaths in the attack beyond the aircraft's crew, though several U.S. servicemen were injured from debris and ignited fuel.

Aftermath 
Randolph was repaired at the port facilities available at Ulithi and rejoined the U.S. fleet in April, 1945. She then took part in the Battle of Okinawa, where Admiral Mitscher shifted his flag to her after Kamikaze attacks successively knocked both USS Bunker Hill and USS Enterprise out of the battle.

See also
US Naval Base Carolines

References

Notes

Bibliography

External links

March 1945 events in Asia
Pacific Ocean theatre of World War II